WJDE-CD (channel 23) is a low-power, Class A television station in Nashville, Tennessee, United States, affiliated with several digital multicast networks. Owned by the Word Broadcasting Network, the station has a transmitter off Interstate 65 at the corner of Dickerson Pike and Maplewood Trace. Master control and most internal operations are based at the studios of flagship station WBNA on Fern Valley Road (just north of State Route 1747) in Okolona, a suburb of Louisville.

History

The station signed on in 1986 by South Central Communications, under the call sign W24AE and broadcast programming from the Home Shopping Network (HSN) 24/7. In 1995, the station's call sign was changed to WJDE-LP, and in 2011, when the station converted to digital, the call sign became WJDE-LD.

WJDE-LD continued in this format until 2012, when it began broadcasting classic television programming from MeTV, added Christian programming from the Sonlife Broadcasting Network to a second subchannel, and   moved HSN's programming to a third digital subchannel. The station was sold to its current owner, Word Broadcasting Network, a subsidiary of Evangel World Prayer Center of Louisville, Kentucky, around the same time. It then added a fourth subchannel, TV Scout, which broadcast TV listings 24 hours a day. TV Scout was replaced by Soul of the South Network in 2014.

On January 8, 2015, WJDE added the Heroes & Icons (H&I) and Decades channels. On September 4, WJDE discontinued its long-time HSN affiliation after HSN briefly moved to the station's fourth subchannel from January to September 2015. Programming from HSN was replaced by infomercials. Also, on September 4, the Soul of the South Network affiliation was discontinued and was replaced with Movies!.

In October 2015, Soul of the South Network returned to WJDE's line-up on the second subchannel with Decades moving to the third subchannel. Home Shopping Network was re-added to the fourth subchannel.

The MeTV affiliation was scheduled to move to WKRN-DT3 when Live Well Network announced that it would cease operations. However, MeTV was never added to WKRN's third subchannel. Instead, Justice Network was added and MeTV moved to WKRN-DT2, replacing the Nashville WX Channel, with H&I returning to the main channel on February 1, 2016. 
 
On March 12, 2018, The Country Network replaced The Soul of the South Network on DT2.

On January 1, 2019, NewsNet replaced HSN on its DT4. HSN still continued to be available on Ion Media station WNPX-TV's sixth digital subchannel, until June 30, 2021, when it would be replaced by the new women's reality television network, TrueReal. HSN would make its return a few months later on a new thirteenth subchannel of WJDE on September 1, 2021.

On January 14, WJDE added two more subchannels, Faith USA on 31.7 and GEB America on 31.8.

On September 23, 2019, WJDE discontinued Heroes & Icons, Decades, Movies! (these three networks moved to WJFB and WKUW-LD at the same time they were discontinued from WJDE), and Faith USA, which was dropped altogether and is no longer carried in the Nashville market. The first and sixth subchannels of WJDE carried a temporary simulcast of Sonlife Broadcasting Network which has been carried on the fifth subchannel of WJDE since 2012. This simulcast ended on October 14, 2019, and was replaced with QVC2.

On October 30, the Sonlife Broadcasting Network was discontinued from WJDE's main channel and was replaced with the Country Music & Lifestyle Network Heartland The third and seventh subchannels were replaced with Right Now TV, a new network that continues to be carried on the third subchannel of WJDE.

The call sign changed to the current WJDE-CD on October 16, 2019.

On October 30, 2019, the seventh subchannel carrying Right Now TV was replaced by a local channel carrying religious programming mostly based in Nashville, Tennessee. On March 9, 2020, the local channel was replaced by America's Voice, a conservative news channel. On April 1, 2020, WJDE discontinued NewsNet and replaced it with Retro Television Network (which was previously seen on WRTN-LD).

On December 27, 2020, WJDE added Estrella TV to a new 31.9 subchannel, making it a second Spanish outlet behind Univision/UniMás affiliate WLLC-LP.

On January 31, 2021, WJDE added the Chinese-American oriented network New Tang Dynasty Television to a new 31.11 subchannel.

On March 1, 2021, WJDE added Ace TV (American Classic Entertainment Television) to a new twelfth subchannel of 31.12; the subchannel carries classic television programming from the 1960s through the early 2000s.

Technical information

Subchannels
The station's digital signal  multiplexed:

Former affiliations

References

External links
WJDE31.com

JDE-LD
Low-power television stations in the United States
Television channels and stations established in 1986
1986 establishments in Tennessee
Heartland (TV network) affiliates
Retro TV affiliates